American football in Norway began in 1949 when students from two secondary schools (videregående) in Oslo—at Riis and Ullern—began playing an annual gridiron game, starting with a meeting on October 30.  An Associated Press report from Oslo the next day noted that a crowd of 500 watched, and that the introduction of the sport was credited to "Alf Stenere, former Norwegian exchange student to Bowdoin College, and Tony Bower of Kansas City, 17-year old student here".  Reportedly, Riis won the first game, 20–13.

In 1983, the Norwegian American Football Federation (NAFF) was founded, and played its first international game in Stockholm, Sweden, and won 38–0.  An article of the game appeared in the Norway's second largest newspaper Dagbladet, on January 28, 1985.  In Stockholm, Sweden, again, for the first Scandinavian Cup in American football, to be played by Sweden, Finland' and Norway, NAFF became the champion.  An article on the Cup appeared in SAGA, Norway's English-language newspaper, on September 19, 1985.

Challenging the Coventry Bears American Football Club in England, on May 9, 1986, NAFF became victorious.

The Norwegians tasted football defeat for the first time when St. Olaf College from Minnesota was invited to Oslo during 1986, and the final score was 65–0.

The football players from Norway traveled to Minnesota to play St. Olaf College again.  NAFF lost again 65–0, the college boys intentionally decided not to run up the score on their visitors.  An article of the game appeared in the local newspaper called The News, Northfield, Minnesota, on July 21, 1988.

St. Olaf College arranged for NAFF players to visit the Minnesota Vikings training camp and to socialize with the professional players of American football.

References 

American football in Norway
Minnesota Vikings